The Croatia national rugby union team is governed by the Croatian Rugby Union. Croatia have been playing internationals rugby since 1992, they have yet to qualify for the Rugby World Cup. The national side is ranked 39th in the world (as of 18 July 2022)

Internationals 

Croatia played their first international on 28 November 1992, away against Bosnia & Herzegovina, and won 47–3. Croatia played four the following year with wins over Austria and Hungary. They then faced off against Italy, who won 76–11. The year finished off with a win over Morocco 36–12 but a loss to Spain .

The following year they won three of their five fixtures, though they lost to Ukraine and Luxembourg, though the following year, they were able to defeat Luxembourg in 1995. Croatia won a number of games in 1996–97, defeating the likes of Israel, Norway, Bulgaria, Latvia and Moldova and but losing to an experienced Georgia that year by 29–15.

1997 to 2000, Croatia played 11 International for 10 wins and 1 loss (to the Netherlands).

Croatia won five matches in a row from 2001 to 2002. Croatia started in round three of the 2007 Rugby World Cup European qualification tournament but were knocked out by Latvia and Andorra.

On St. Patrick's Day 17 March 2007, in Knin, the Croatian national team played an Irish Barbarians side and won the St. Pat's in Knin Cup.

On 10 November 2007 Croatia defeated Malta 24–9 in Makarska. There are two internationals coming up in 2008 with Croatia taking on Andorra in Split (19 April) and away to Latvia in Riga (10 May)

Famous players 
Croatia have a host of players who are New Zealanders, Australians and South Africans of Croatian origin who play the game and have played internationally for these countries. The first New Zealander of Croatian descent to play for Croatia was Brendon Winslow against Luxembourg in 1995.

Other New Zealanders, were Paul Vegar (North Shore, NZ reps), Paul Vujcich (Counties, Manurewa and North Shore) and the Graham brothers Rob and Reon (Counties, Patumahoe, Manurewa).

Anthony Posa was another New Zealander who played many times for Croatia (1996–2003), playing out of both the GHA RFC, Glasgow, Scotland and Beverley RUFC, Yorkshire, England. He is now Head Coach of the Yorkshire Under 20 County side which has won numerous English National County Championships and coaches professionally at the Doncaster club in England. His family originated from the Island of Korčula.

Frano Botica was a one time Croatian rugby player and former All Black, whose grandparents were also born in Korčula. Another former All Black who turned out for the Croatian side at the same time was Matthew Cooper. Dan Luger is an England representative whose father Darko Luger is from the island of Brac. Sean Fitzpatrick is another former All Black captain who has Croatian heritage.

Record

World Cup

European Competitions

Overall

Recent Matches

Current squad
The following players formed the squad for the 2021–22 Rugby Europe Conference 1 South match against Cyprus on 13 November 2021.
Known Caps updated after match with Cyprus.

Head coach:  Anthony Posa

|}

See also
 Rugby union in Croatia

References

External links 
 

European national rugby union teams
Rugby union in Croatia
Teams in European Nations Cup (rugby union)
Rugby Union